Shekhar P. Seshadri is a psychiatrist and professor of the Department of Child and Adolescent Psychiatry in NIMHANS, Bangalore, India. He is widely quoted by the media and has for decades been associated with numerous mental health initiatives. He is the older brother of the actress, Meenakshi Seshadri. He has co-authored two books and has also written chapters as a guest author. He is known for his research work in life skills training, child sexual abuse, masculinities, women's mental health issues and sexual minorities.

Personal life
He is married to Professor Anisha Shah, Nimhans for more than two decades.

Bibliography
 Parenting: The Art and Science of Nurturing, (co-authored by Nirupama Rao, Byword Books, 2013)
 Play: Experiential Methodologies in Developmental and Therapeutic Settings, (co-authored by Shubhada A. Maitra, Orient Blackswan, 2012)

References

External links
 Shekhar Seshadri talks about Life Skills Education

Indian psychiatrists
Medical doctors from Bangalore